Madlener is a surname. Notable people with the surname include:

Barry Madlener (born 1969), Dutch politician of the Party for Freedom (PVV)
Elaine Madlener (1912–1989), manuscript and autograph collector
Josef Madlener (1881–1967), German artist and illustrator

See also
Madlener House, also known as Albert F. Madlener House, is a Prairie School house located at 4 West Burton Street in Chicago, Illinois, United States